The 2007 Zuiderduin Masters was a darts tournament held at the Hotel Zuiderduin in Egmond aan Zee, the Netherlands, run by the British Darts Organisation and the World Darts Federation. It was the first edition of the tournament since the sponsorship of the event was taken over by the Hotel Zuiderduin to become the Zuiderduin Masters. A new tournament format was also introduced. It was also the last year the tournament was held as an unranked event and a men's only competition.

The last winner of the event, Mervyn King in 2005 as no event was held in 2006, was absent from the field as he had transferred over to the PDC earlier in the year. Martin Adams, the BDO World Champion, was knocked out in the quarter-finals by Gary Robson. The number one seed Gary Anderson defeated Mark Webster in the final, 5–4 in sets, to win the event for the first time. He added this event to his successes at the International Darts League and the World Darts Trophy in May and September.

Prize money

Qualifying

Results

Group stage 

all matches best of 9 legs.P = Played; W = Won; L = Lost; LF = Legs for; LA = Legs against; +/- = Leg difference; Pts = Points

Group A

Martin Atkins  5–1 Robert Wagner  
Gary Anderson  5–1  Robert Wagner  
Gary Anderson  5–3  Martin Atkins  

Group B

Remco van Eijden  5–0 Ted Hankey  
Ted Hankey  5–2  Niels de Ruiter  
Remco van Eijden  5–2  Niels de Ruiter  

Group C

John Walton  5–3 Mario Robbe  
Darryl Fitton  5–0 Mario Robbe  
Darryl Fitton  5–2 John Walton 

Group D

Steve West  5–2 Joey ten Berge  
Scott Waites  5–4 Joey ten Berge  
Steve West  5–2 Steve West 

Group E

Phil Nixon  5–3 Steve Coote  
Martin Adams  5–0 Steve Coote  
Martin Adams  5–0 Phil Nixon  

Group F

Martin Phillips  5–3 Tony O'Shea  
Tony O'Shea  5–3 Gary Robson  
Gary Robson  5–2 Martin Phillips  

Group G

Shaun Greatbatch  5–0 Edwin Max  
Mark Webster  5–1 Edwin Max  
Mark Webster  5–3 Shaun Greatbatch  

Group H

Mark Barilli  5–0 Andy Fordham  
Co Stompé  5–0 Andy Fordham  
Co Stompé  5–3 Mark Barilli

Knockout stages

References 

2007 in darts
2007 in Dutch sport
Finder Darts Masters